Patrick Joseph McGilligan (12 April 1889 – 15 November 1979) was an Irish Fine Gael politician who served as the 14th Attorney General of Ireland from 1954 to 1957, Minister for Finance from 1948 to 1951, Minister for External Affairs from 1927 to 1932 and Minister for Industry and Commerce from 1924 to 1932. He served as a Teachta Dála (TD) from 1923 to 1965.

Early life
McGilligan was born in Hanover Place, Coleraine, County Londonderry, the son of Patrick McGilligan, a draper, who would serve as MP for South Fermanagh from 1892 to 1895 for the Irish Parliamentary Party, and Catherine O'Farrell. He was educated at St Columb's College in Derry; Clongowes Wood College in County Kildare and University College Dublin.

Lawyer and politician
He joined Sinn Féin but was unsuccessful in his attempt to be elected as an MP at the 1918 general election. McGilligan was called to the bar in 1921.

Minister for Industry and Commerce
He was elected as a Cumann na nGaedheal TD for the National University at a by-election held on 3 November 1923. His time in Government was marked by economic retrenchment and a focus on low taxation. At the beginning of his time in office he declared that "People may have to die in this country and may have to die of starvation". Between 1924 and 1932, McGilligan served as Minister for Industry and Commerce, notably pushing through the Shannon hydroelectric scheme, then the largest hydroelectricity project in the world. In 1927, he set up the Electricity Supply Board (ESB), and also the Agricultural Credit Corporation.

Minister for External Affairs

In 1927, McGilligan was appointed as Minister for External Affairs, following the assassination of Kevin O'Higgins by the anti-Treaty elements of the IRA, in revenge for O'Higgins' support for the execution of Republican prisoners during the Irish Civil War (1922–23). In this position, he was hugely influential at the Committee on the Operation of Dominion Legislation and at the Imperial Conference in 1930 (jointly with representatives of Australia, Canada, New Zealand, South Africa and the United Kingdom). The Statute of Westminster that emerged from these meetings gave greater power to dominions in the Commonwealth like the Irish Free State.

In opposition
Following the 1932 general election, Cumann na nGaedhael were sent into opposition for the first time as Fianna Fáil took over as the government. Tensions between the two parties ratcheted up as both sides began to turn towards paramilitaries. The Irish Republican Army began to disrupt Cumann na nGaedhael public meetings, and in turn, a pro-Cumann na nGaedhael paramilitary called the Army Comrades Association (later better known as the Blueshirts) was created to counteract the IRA and disrupt Fianna Fáil meetings. As the links between the Blueshirts and Cumann na nGaedhael rapidly developed, sitting CnaG Teachta Dála Thomas F. O'Higgins became the leader of the ACA. He was joined by a number of other CnaG TDs including McGilligan. Cumann na nGaedhael, The National Centre Party and the Blueshirts would eventually merge into one new party called Fine Gael in the aftermath of the 1933 general election and the banning of the Blueshirts. Despite their combination of strength, they failed to make much of an impact in the 1934 local elections either. In fact, Fine Gael would remain in opposition until the 1948 general election.

During this period in opposition from 1932 to 1948, McGilligan built up a law practice and became professor of constitutional and international law at University College, Dublin. When the National University Dáil constituency was abolished in 1937 (before being recreated in the Seanad in 1938), McGilligan was elected as TD for Dublin North-West.

Minister for Finance
In 1948, McGilligan was appointed Minister for Finance in the first Inter-Party Government. As Minister, he undertook some major reforms. He instigated a new approach where the government invested radically in capital projects. Colleagues however complained of his frequent absence from the Cabinet table and the difficulty of contacting him at the Department of Finance Between 1954 and 1957, he served as Attorney General, a job in which, as he himself admitted, he felt far more at home in than as Minister for Finance. He retired from Dáil Éireann at the 1965 general election, having served for over 40 years.

Death and legacy
Patrick McGilligan died in Dublin on 15 November 1979; at the age of ninety. A later Attorney General, John M. Kelly in the preface to his definitive text, The Irish Constitution (1980), noted the remarkable number of senior judges who were former students of McGilligan and suggested that given his own firm belief in the value of judicial review he deserves much of the credit for the remarkable development of Irish law in this field since the early 1960s.

References

1889 births
1979 deaths
Cumann na nGaedheal TDs
Fine Gael TDs
Ministers for Finance (Ireland)
Ministers for Foreign Affairs (Ireland)
Attorneys General of Ireland
Members of the 4th Dáil
Members of the 5th Dáil
Members of the 6th Dáil
Members of the 7th Dáil
Members of the 8th Dáil
Members of the 9th Dáil
Members of the 10th Dáil
Members of the 11th Dáil
Members of the 12th Dáil
Members of the 13th Dáil
Members of the 14th Dáil
Members of the 15th Dáil
Members of the 16th Dáil
Members of the 17th Dáil
Members of the Blueshirts
People from Coleraine, County Londonderry
People educated at Clongowes Wood College
People educated at St Columb's College
Alumni of University College Dublin
Sinn Féin parliamentary candidates
Teachtaí Dála for the National University of Ireland
Ministers for Enterprise, Trade and Employment